Gostivar is a municipality in the western part of North Macedonia.
 Gostivar is also the name of the town where the municipal seat is found.
 Gostivar Municipality is part of the Polog Statistical Region.

Geography
The municipality borders
 the Mavrovo and Rostuša, Kičevo municipalities to the south,
 Makedonski Brod Municipality to the east,
 Brvenica and Vrapčište municipalities to the north, and
 Albania and Kosovo to the west.

Demographics
The municipality has 35 inhabited places, one town and 34 villages.

According to the last national census from 2021 this municipality has 59,770 inhabitants.

Mother tongues among the municipality residents include:
Albanian: 33,204 (55.6%)
Macedonian: 14,313 (24.0%)
Turkish: 7,576 (12.7%)
Persons for whom data are taken from administrative sources: 3,409 (5.7%)
Romani: 1,087 (1.8%)
Others: 181 (0.3%)

History 

Several villages were burned down in Gostivar during 1912-16 by Serbian and Bulgarian forces. Two of these villages were Reč, which had a population in 1900 of 140 Muslim Albanians and 150 Orthodox Albanians, and Strezimir which at that time was inhabited by 56 Muslim Albanians and 180 Orthodox Albanians. Another such example is Štirovica.

On 26 November 2019, an earthquake struck Albania and Gostivar Municipality contributed humanitarian aid and teams of firefighters and doctors toward the relief effort for earthquake victims.

References

External links
 Official website

 
Polog Statistical Region
Municipalities of North Macedonia